Xamoterol is a cardiac stimulant. It works by binding to the β1 adrenergic receptor. It is a 3rd generation adrenergic β receptor partial agonist. It provides cardiac stimulation at rest but it acts as a blocker during exercise.

References 

Beta1-adrenergic agonists
Cardiac stimulants
Inotropic agents
4-Morpholinyl compunds
Phenol ethers
Phenols